This is a list of administrators and governors of Gongola State. 
Gongola State was formed on 1976-02-03 when North-Eastern State was divided into Bauchi, Borno, and Gongola states. In 1991-08-27 Gongola State was divided into Adamawa State and Taraba State.

See also
States of Nigeria
List of state governors of Nigeria

References

Gongola